Eucinetidae is a family of beetles, notable for their large coxal plates that cover much of the first ventrite of the abdomen, sometimes called plate-thigh beetles. The family is small for beetles, with about 50 species in 11 genera, but are found worldwide.

Adults are generally elliptical in shape, ranging from 0.8 to 4.0 mm in length, and black or brown in color. The head is small and bent underneath.

Eucinetids live in detritus or in fungus-covered tree bark, where both adults and larvae are assumed to eat various sorts of fungi. Around half of the genera possess strongly modified mouthparts, particularly the labrum, adapted for suctorial feeding.

Genera
These genera belong to the family Eucinetidae:
 Eucinetella
 Eucinetus Germar, 1818
 Euscaphurus Casey, 1885
 Noteucinetus Bullians & Leschen, 2005
 Nycteus Latreille, 1829
 Peltocoleops Ponomarenko, 1990
 Subulistomella Sakai, 1980
 †Huaxiacinectus Hong 1995 Huachi-Huanhe Formation, China, Early Cretaceous (Hauterivian)
 Suctorial clade:
 Eucilodes Vit, 1985
 †Cretohlezkus Jałoszyński 2019 Burmese amber, Myanmar, mid Cretaceous (Albian-Cenomanian)
 Bisaya Reitter, 1884
 Jentozkus Vít, 1977
 Tohlezkus Vít, 1977
 Proeuzkus Vit, 2000

References

 Daniel K. Young, "Eucinetidae", in Ross H. Arnett, Jr. and Michael C. Thomas, American Beetles (CRC Press, 2002), vol. 2

External links
Elateriformia (Coleoptera) - EUCINETIDAE 

Scirtoidea
Beetle families